Keith Francis Palmer  (born 27 July 1947) is a British businessman.

Education
Palmer was born in Cardiff to Gwenda and Frank Palmer. His early education was at Howardian High School in Cardiff. He graduated from the University of Birmingham with a BSc in Geology in 1968, and a PhD in 1971.

Career
Palmer is a businessman in public–private partnerships in international development. He was the founding chairman of economic consultancy Cambridge Economic Policy Associates (CEPA) and is currently chairman of AgDevCo, which develops sustainable agriculture in Africa, and of InfraCo, which develops infrastructure in Africa and Asia. Previously Palmer was Vice-Chairman of N M Rothschild & Sons from 1997 to 2002. He is a Research Fellow at the London School of Economics and was an Honorary Professor at the University of Dundee's Centre for Energy, Petroleum and Mineral Law and Policy.

Honours
Palmer was appointed an Officer of the Order of the British Empire in the 2010 Birthday Honours for services to economic development overseas. He was awarded the honorary degree of DUniv by Birmingham University in 2013.

Personal life
Palmer has been married to Penny McDonagh since 1974; they have four daughters.

References

Alumni of the University of Birmingham
Living people
1947 births
Officers of the Order of the British Empire
British businesspeople